WVOH may refer to:

 WVOH-FM, a radio station (93.5 FM) licensed to serve Hazlehurst, Georgia, United States
 WGTM (AM), a radio station (1520 AM) licensed to serve Spindale, North Carolina, United States, which held the call sign WVOH from 2012 to 2014
 WHJD, a radio station (920 AM) licensed to serve Hazlehurst, Georgia, which held the call sign WVOH until 2011